The Jalancagak District is a district of Subang Regency in West Java. It is famous for its sweet pineapples.

See also

Districts of West Java

Subang Regency
Districts of West Java